Not 4 Sale is the fourth studio album by Canadian rapper Kardinal Offishall, released September 9, 2008 on Kon Live/Geffen Records. It is his second international major-label album after Quest for Fire: Firestarter, Vol. 1, released in 2001. It was a critical success, and included the top five Billboard Hot 100 single "Dangerous", and the minor hit "Numba 1 (Tide Is High)".

Background 
On July 2, 2007, the single "Graveyard Shift", featuring Akon, was premiered on Sirius Satellite Radio's Hip-Hop Nation channel. It was originally the album's first single. In March 2008, the first single "Dangerous", also featuring Akon, was released. It proved to be Kardinal's most successful single, peaking at number five on the Billboard Hot 100.

In June 2008, Kardinal released the mixtape, Limited Time Only, which had snippets of five songs that would appear on the album. One of those songs, "Burnt", featuring Lindo P, was accompanied by a music video in late June. On July 15, "Burnt" and "Set It Off" featuring Clipse, were released on iTunes; In August, a music video was released for "Set It Off". The song "Numba 1 (Tide Is High)", featuring Rihanna, is a cover of the reggae song "The Tide Is High". The version featuring Keri Hilson is the album's fourth single. A music video was released for the song "Nina", though it was not released as a single.

Kardinal's idea for the album title was from a custom-made T-shirt which read "Not 4 Sale" and had a bar code on it. Kardinal explained why he chose Not 4 Sale as the title:

Reception 

The album sold 11,869 copies in the United States in its first week of release. It entered the Billboard 200 at number 40. As of February 15, 2009, the album has sold 34,822 copies. In Canada, it entered the Canadian Albums Chart at number eight, with 4,247 copies sold in the first week.

The album received generally favorable reviews from music critics. AllMusic gave it 4 out of 5 stars, calling it "an entirely solid album," also stating "this freedom fighting and socially conscious writing is tempered with hooky club tracks that never fail." USA Today gave it 3 out of 4 stars, noting "his potent blend of hip-hop and dancehall gives him a flavor all his own." PopMatters gave the album a 6/10 rating, writing "although many of the tracks here are glossy pop productions, Kardinal has not really changed since he was first heard in the '90s." The album won the award for Rap Recording of the Year at the 2009 Juno Awards.

Track listing

Samples and interpolations 
 "Numba 1 (Tide Is High)" contains an interpolation of "The Tide Is High" by The Paragons
 "Ill Eagle Alien" contains an interpolation of "Englishman in New York" by Sting
 "Nina" contains excerpts from "My Conversation" by Slim Smith & The Uniques

Chart positions

Personnel 

 Hakim Abdulsamad – producer  
 Chris Athens – mastering  
 Leslie Brathwaite – mixing  
 Bryan Brock – art direction, design  
 Danny Reid Carter – A&R  
 Mike "Angry" Eleopoulos – engineer  
 Cliff Feiman – production supervisor  
 Jeremy Harding – mixing  
 Shawn Holiday "Tubby" – executive producer, A&R  
 Jason Joshua – mixing  

 Tyson Kuteyi – mixing, vocal mixing  
 Glenn Lewis – composer
 Paul Marshall – engineer  
 Martin Riley – composer  
 Fareed Salamah – mixing assistant  
 James "Scrappy" Stassen – engineer  
 Devyne Stephens – executive producer  
 Aliaune "Akon" Thiam – producer, executive producer  
 Lloyd Tyrell – composer  
 Ianthe Zevos – creative art

Release history

References 

2008 albums
Albums produced by Akon
Albums produced by Alex da Kid
Albums produced by Boi-1da
Albums produced by Jake One
Albums produced by Kardinal Offishall
Albums produced by Nottz
Geffen Records albums
Kardinal Offishall albums
KonLive Distribution albums
Juno Award for Rap Recording of the Year recordings